Forty-Eighters may refer to:
 Forty-Eighters, European supporters of the Revolutions of 1848
 Forty-Eighters, participants in the American liberal political organization, the Committee of 48 (1919–24)
 Forty-Eighters, members of the People's Party of Korea, that joined the Workers' Party of South Korea in 1948

See also
 Forty and Eight veterans organization in the United States